Boronia citriodora, commonly known as lemon-scented boronia, lemon plant or lemon thyme, is a woody shrub that is endemic to Tasmania. It has pinnate leaves and white to pink flowers that are arranged singly or in groups of up to seven, in the leaf axils or on the ends of the branches.

Description
The side leaflets are similar but longer.

Taxonomy and naming
Boronia citriodora was first formally described in 1855 by Joseph Dalton Hooker from an unpublished description by Ronald Campbell Gunn and the description was published in The botany of the Antarctic voyage of H.M. Discovery ships Erebus and Terror. The name is derived from the characteristic lemon scent of the foliage. Hooker noted that the plant has a "strong and delicious smell of lemons" and that the species was called the 'lemon-plant' by early Tasmanian colonists.

In 2003, Marco Duretto described three subspecies:
 Boronia citriodora subsp. orientalis that has hairy sepals;

Distribution and habitat
Lemon-scented boronia grows in heath, woodland and near rainforest, often in rocky places.
 Subspecies citriodora only grows on the Central Highlands of Tasmania, at altitudes above  with disjunct populations further south, including on Mount Field.
 Subspecies orientalis is only known from Ben Lomond and Mount Barrow;
 Subspecies paulwilsonii is only known from the south-west of Tasmania, south from Macquarie Harbour and west from Mount Shea.

Use in horticulture
Boronia citriodora is cultivated as an ornamental plant for use in gardens. It tolerates sun, shade, wind, heavy frost; and dry, sandy or waterlogged soils.

References 

citriodora
Endemic flora of Tasmania
Garden plants of Australia
Plants described in 1855
Taxa named by Joseph Dalton Hooker